The Expediency Discernment Council of the System ( Majma'-e Taškhīs-e Maslahat-e Nezām) is an administrative assembly appointed by the Supreme Leader and was created upon the revision to the Constitution of the Islamic Republic of Iran on 6 February 1988. It was originally set up to resolve differences or conflicts between the Majlis and the Guardian Council, but "its true power lies more in its advisory role to the Supreme Leader." According to Hooman Majd, the Leader "delegated some of his own authority to the council—granting it supervisory powers over all branches of the government" following President Mahmoud Ahmadinejad's election in 2005.

Members of the council are chosen by the Supreme Leader every five years.

History and role
By 1987, the legislative process as well as the country's long-term policy formation had come to a standstill due to the doctrinal conflict between radical factions of the Islamic Consultative Assembly and the Guardian Council, which officials described as coercive at the time. Consultations in February the following year led to Ayatollah Khomeini ordering the appointment of a 13-member council that was given legislative authority: it could pass temporary laws (effective for three-year periods). Article 112 of Iran's Constitution states the EDC will be convened by the Supreme Leader to determine expedience cases where the Guardian Council finds an Islamic Consultative Assembly decision against the principles of religious law or the constitution, and where the Consultative Assembly is unable to satisfy the Guardian Council in view of the expedience of the Islamic Republic of Iran. Formally, the Expediency Discernment Council of the System (or Regime) is primarily a constitutional advisory body for the Supreme Leader (at the latter's behest), as described in article 112 of the Islamic Republic's Constitution. It is meant to "discern the interests of the Islamic Republic" by resolving internal regime conflicts. The Council consisted of thirteen members when originally convened, and included six clergy members (appointed by the Supreme Leader), six public officials (President, Prime Minister, Majles Speaker, Supreme Court Chief Justice, Prosecutor General, and a Supreme Leader representative), as well as the Majles member whose legislation was overturned. The EDC Chairman is appointed every five years by the Supreme Leader. Even though the Supreme Leader is a member of the Council itself (and it being his advisory council), he can deputize the Council. Nine years later, in 1997, Khamenei expanded its membership to thirty-four, twenty-five of whom were thence appointed for five-year terms. During February 2007, a new Council was formed, with twenty-seven members being directly chosen by the Supreme Leader this time.

As stated by article 111, if the position of Supreme Leader is undeclared for whatever reason, a council composed of President, head of the Judiciary, and one of the jurisconsults of the Guardian Council chosen by the EDC shall discharge his functions collectively and temporarily. If any of them is unable to discharge his duties, another person shall be appointed by the EDC in his place. The Council also resolves disputes that concern the Guardian Council and the Majles. Domestic and foreign policies of the regime are determined only after consultation with the Expediency Council, according to article 110 of the Constitution (with oversight of the Supreme Leader). The Expediency Council is only meant to act on behalf of the legislative branch, although in reality it intercedes as a mediator between all bureaucratic branches, including the executive. If ratification of the Consultative Assembly is not confirmed by the Guardian Council (and deputies insist on implementing the ratification), the EDC can intervene to make a decision. The Expediency Discernment Council can advise the faghih on policy and strategy (in accordance to article 111 of the Constitution), and despite not being part of the legislative branch, it can remove parliamentary powers. As an example of this, in April 2000 it removed from parliamentary capacity the faculty to investigate institutions under the control of the Supreme Leader, such as the Pasdaran and the Council of the Guardians. In practice, its composition almost guarantees its rulings mirror the legal opinion the Guardian Council, and more importantly, the Supreme Leader's. Being dominated by conservative ulama, this has furthered the faction's grip over Iran.

During August 2001, the Council was convened by the Supreme Leader to resolve the dispute between the Judiciary and the Assembly. The latter was dominated by reformers, while the former was dominated by conservatives, so the Ali Khamenei wanted the EDC to settle this political confrontation. The confrontation referred to the parliament's rejection to approve conservative candidates' appointments to the Guardian Council. Conservatives did not want to lose control of the Guardian Council, dreading president Mohammad Khatami and reformist allies would push through political and social reforms. Members of the Council are generally ayatollahs and hojatoleslams (a step before ayatollah). In 2005, the capacity of the Council to act as a government supervisory body was supplemented to its powers. The EDC's influence grew when cleric Hashemi Rafsanjani joined it.

Members

Current members (2022–Present)

Historic membership
Eighth council (2017–2022)

Seventh council (2012–2017)
On 14 March 2012, a new council was appointed for a five-year period. Eight months before the end of the council, chairman Akbar Hashemi Rafsanjani dies and Ali Movahedi-Kermani became interim chairman until the end of the council period. 

 Akbar Hashemi Rafsanjani (Chairman until January 2017)
 Ali Movahedi-Kermani (Chairman from February 2017)
 Mohsen Rezaei (Secretary) 
 Ahmad Jannati
 Mahmoud Hashemi Shahroudi
 Ebrahim Amini
 Hassan Rouhani
 Ali Akbar Nategh Nouri
 Ali Larijani
 Hassan Sane'i
 Gholam-Hossein Mohseni-Eje'i
 Ghorbanali Dorri-Najafabadi
 Mahmoud Mohammadi Araghi
 Majid Ansari
 Gholamreza Mesbahi-Moghadam
 Gholam Reza Aghazadeh
 Ali Agha-Mohammadi
 Abbas Vaez-Tabasi, followed by Mahmoud Ahmadinejad
 Mohammad Javad Irvani
 Mohammad Reza Bahonar
 Habibollah Asgaroladi
 Saeed Jalili
 Gholam Ali Haddad-Adel
 Hassan Habibi
 Davoud Danesh Jafari
 Parviz Davoudi
 Hossein Saffar Harandi
 Mohammad Reza Aref
 Mohammad Forouzandeh
 Lt. General Hassan Firouzabadi
 Hossein Mohammadi
 Hossein Mozaffar
 Mostafa Mir-Salim
 Morteza Nabavi
 Ali Akbar Velayati
 Lt. General Ahmad Vahidi
 Sadegh Vaez-Zadeh

Ex officio members:

 President: Mahmoud Ahmadinejad, followed by Hassan Rouhani
 Parliament Speaker: Ali Larijani 
 Judiciary Chief: Sadeq Larijani
 SNSC Secretary: Saeed Jalili, followed by Rear Admiral Ali Shamkhani
 Clergy members of Guardians Council at one point:
Ahmad Jannati
Mohammad Momen
Mohammad-Reza Modarresi Yazdi
Mehdi Shabzendedar
Mohammad Yazdi
Mahmoud Hashemi Shahroudi
 The minister concerned depending on the subject under discussion 
 The parliament commission head concerned depending on the subject under discussion 

Sixth council (2007–2012)
The following is a list of its members of the years (2007-2012):

 Hashemi Rafsanjani, Akbar, Ayatollah (Chairman of the Council) *
 Mohsen Rezaee, PhD* (Secretary General)
 Jannati, Ahmad, Ayatollah *
 Vaez Tabasi, Abbas, Ayatollah *
 Amini Najafabadi, Ebrahim, Ayatollah *
 Haddad-Adel, Gholam Ali, PhD *
 Emami Kashani, Mohammad, Ayatollah *
 Movahedi-Kermani, Ali, Ayatollah *
 Habibi, Hassan Ebrahim, PhD *
 Mousavi, Mir Hossein MSc *
 Velayati, Ali Akbar, MD *
 Dorri Najafabadi, Ghorbanali, Ayatollah *
 Mohammadi Reyshahri, Mohammad, Hojatoleslam *
 Sane'i, Hassan, Hojatoleslam *
 Rouhani, Hassan, Hojatoleslam, PhD *
 Asgar Owladi, Habibollah *
 Larijani, Ali, PhD *
 Bahonar, Mohammad Reza
 Tavassoli Mahallati, Mohammad Reza, Ayatollah *
 Mirsalim, Mostafa *
 Nabavi, Morteza *
 Ali Akbar Nategh-Nouri, Hojatoleslam *
 Firouzabadi, Hassan, Major General *
 Aghazadeh, Gholam Reza *
 Namdar Zanganeh, Bijan *
 Ali Agha-Mohammadi
 Mohammad Forouzandeh
 Davoud Danesh-Jafari
 Majid Ansari
 Hossein Mozaffar
 Mohammad Javad Irvani
 Mohammad Reza Aref
 Gholam-Hossein Mohseni-Eje'i
 Mohammad Hashemi Rafsanjani
 Parviz Davoodi

Ex officio members:
 President
 Speaker of Majles
 Chief of the Judiciary
 The minister concerned depending on the subject under discussion
 The representative of Majlis commission concerning the subject discussed
 If mediating between Majlis and Guardian Council, the council will also include the six clerics of the Guardian Council.

Fifth council (2002–2007)
The following is a list of its members of the years 2002-2007.
 Hashemi Rafsanjani, Akbar, Ayatollah (Chairman) *
 Amini Najafabadi, Ibrahim, Ayatollah *
 Vaez Tabasi, Abbas, Hojatoleslam *
 Emami Kashani, Mohammad, Ayatollah *
 Mousavi, Mir Hussein *
 Velayati, Ali Akbar *
 Mohammadi Reyshahri, Mohammad, Hojatoleslam *
 Sane'i, Hassan, Hojatoleslam *
 Rouhani, Hassan, Hojatoleslam, PhD *
 Asgar Owladi, Habibollah *
 Dorri Najafabadi, Qorbanali, Hojatoleslam *
 Larijani, Ali *
 Mirsalim, Mostafa *
 Tavassoli Mahallati, Mohammadreza, Ayatollah *
 Nabavi, Morteza *
 Firouzabadi, Hassan, Major General *
 Aqazadeh, Gholamreza *
 Namdar Zanganeh, Bijan *
 Rafsanjani, Mohammad Hashemi *
 Habibi, Hassan Ibrahim *
 Mohsen Rezaee * (Secretary General of the Council)
 Ahmad Jannati
 Ali Movahedi-Kermani
 Ali Akbar Nategh-Nouri
 Mohammad Reza Aref
 Gholam Ali Haddad-Adel
 Majid Ansari
 Mohammad Reza Bahonar
 Hossein Mozaffar
 Mohammad Javad Irvani
 Mehdi Karroubi (appointed at 2004)

(*) Re-appointed

Ex officio members:
 President
 Speaker of Majles
 Chief of the Judiciary
 The minister concerned depending on the subject under discussion
 The representative of Majlis commission concerning the subject discussed
 If mediating between Majlis and Guardian Council, the council will also include the six clerics of the Guardian Council.

Fourth council (1997–2002)
The following is a list of its members of the year 1997-2002.

 Hashemi Rafsanjani, Akbar, Hojatoleslam (Chairman)
 Mohsen Rezaee (Secretary General from Sept. 1997) 
 Mahdavi Kani, Mohammad-Reza, Hojatoleslam
 Amini, Ebrahim , Ayatollah
 Jannati, Ahmad , Ayatollah
 Movahedi-Kermani, Ali, Ayatollah
 Tabasi, Abbas, Hojatoleslam
 Emami Kashani, Mohammad, Ayatollah
 Mousavi, Mir Hussein
 Velayati, Ali Akbar
 Mohammadi Reyshahri, Mohammad, Hojatoleslam
 Sane'i, Hassan, Hojatoleslam
 Rouhani, Hassan, Hojatoleslam, PhD *
 Mousavi Khoeiniha, Mohammad, Hojatoleslam
 Asgar Owladi, Habibollah
 Dorri Najafabadi, Qorbanali, Hojatoleslam
 Larijani, Ali
 Mirsalim, Mostafa
 Tavassoli Mahallati, Mohammadreza, Ayatollah
 Nouri, Abdullah, Hojatoleslam
 Nabavi, Morteza
 Firouzabadi, Hassan, Lt. General
 Aqazadeh, Gholamreza
 Namdar Zanganeh, Bijan
 Rafsanjani, Mohammad Hashemi
 Nourbakhsh, Mohsen
 Habibi, Hassan Ibrahim

Ex officio members:

 President: Khatami, Mohammad, Hojatoleslam 
 Majlis Speaker: Ali Akbar Nateq-Nouri, Hojatoleslam followed by Karroubi, Mehdi, Hojatoleslam
 Judiciary Chief: Yazdi, Mohammad, Ayatollah followed by Hashemi Shahroudi, Mahmoud, Ayatollah
 The minister or head office of administration concerned depending on the subject under discussion
 The representative of Majlis commission concerning the subject which is being discussed 
 Clergy members of Guardians Council at one point: (Only in case of mediating between Majlis and Guardian Council)  
 Jannati, Ahmad, Ayatollah
 Ostadi, Reza, Ayatollah 
 Rezvani, Gholamreza, Ayatollah
 Mo'men, Mohammad, Ayatollah 
 Yazdi, Mohammad, Ayatollah 
 Taheri Khoram-Abadi, Hasan, Ayatollah

Third council (1992–1997)
The following is a list of its members of the year 1992-1997.

Akbar Hashemi Rafsanjani (chairman)
 Mohammad-Reza Mahdavi Kani
 Hassan Sane'i
 Ahmad Khomeini
 Mohammad Mousavi Khoeiniha
 Ali Movahedi-Kermani
 Mohammadreza Tavassoli Mahallati
 Abdullah Nouri
 Hassan Rouhani
 Hassan Ibrahim Habibi
 Mir Hussein Mousavi

Ex officio members:

 President: Akbar Hashemi Rafsanjani 
 Majlis Speaker: Ali Akbar Nateq-Nouri
 Judiciary Chief: Mohammad Yazdi
 The minister or head office of administration concerned depending on the subject under discussion
 The representative of Majlis commission concerning the subject which is being discussed 
 Clergy members of Guardians Council at that time.

Second council (1989–1992)
The following is a list of its members of the year 1989-1992.

 Akbar Hashemi Rafsanjani (chairman)
 Mohammad-Reza Mahdavi Kani
 Yousef Saanei
 Hassan Sane'i
 Ahmad Khomeini
 Mohammad Mousavi Khoeiniha
 Ali Movahedi-Kermani
 Mohammadreza Tavassoli Mahallati
 Abdullah Nouri
 Mir Hussein Mousavi

Ex officio members:

 President: Akbar Hashemi Rafsanjani 
 Majlis Speaker: Mehdi Karroubi followed by Ali Akbar Nateq-Nouri
 Judiciary Chief: Mohammad Yazdi
 The minister or head office of administration concerned depending on the subject under discussion
 The representative of Majlis commission concerning the subject which is being discussed 
 Clergy members of Guardians Council at that time.

First council (February 6, 1988–1989)
The following is a list of its members of the year 1988-1989.

 Ali Khamenei (chairman)
 Mohammadreza Tavassoli Mahallati
 Mohammad Mousavi Khoeiniha
 Mir Hussein Mousavi
 Ahmad Khomeini (Reporting the decision outcomes of Council to Ruhollah Khomeini)

Ex officio members:

 President: Ali Khamenei 
 Majlis Speaker: Akbar Hashemi Rafsanjani 
 Judiciary Chief: Abdul-Karim Mousavi Ardebili
 Clergy members of Guardians Council at that time.

Chairmen
Colour key:

See also
 Center for Strategic Research

References and notes

External links
 
 GlobalSecurity.org on the Expediency Discernment Council
 GlobalSecurity.org's list of members of the Expediency Discernment Council (a little out of date)
 Radio Free Europe/Radio Liberty(RFE/RL) 13 September 2004, mentions Expediency Council
 A Caliphate disguised as a republic

Advisory councils for heads of state
Government of Iran